Paul Everac (August 23, 1924 – October 18, 2011) was a prolific Romanian drama writer who wrote under his birth name, Petre Constantinescu.

He was Chairman of the Romanian Television (TVR) between 1993 and 1994. From 1995 to 1997 he was Chairman of the Nicolae Iorga
Romanian Cultural Institute of Humanistic Research in Venice.

In 1960 he was accepted into the Union of Writers of Romania and, later, the Romanian Academy. His stage plays for the theater had national and foreign representations.

Death
Everac died from cancer at the Floreasca Hospital in Bucharest on October 18, 2011, aged 87.

External links
 Notice of death of Paul Everac (Romanian)

1924 births
2011 deaths
Romanian writers
Romanian educators
Deaths from cancer in Romania